Yesterday (also known as The Victory) is a 1981 Canadian drama film directed by Larry Kent (as Lawrence I. Kent) and starring Vincent Van Patten and Claire Pimparé. It is a love story of a young soldier maimed in Vietnam, who allows his former girlfriend to believe he is dead to spare her anguish.

Cast
 Vincent Van Patten - Matt Kramer
 Claire Pimparé - Gabrielle Daneault
 Nicholas Campbell - Tony
 Jack Wetherall - Moose
 Jacques Godin - Mr. Daneault
 Marthe Mercure - Mrs. Daneault
 Gerard Parkes - Professor Saunders
 Daniel Gadouas - Claude Daneault
 Cloris Leachman - Mrs. Kramer
 Eddie Albert - Bart Kramer

References

External links
 
 

1981 films
Canadian drama films
English-language Canadian films
1981 drama films
Films directed by Larry Kent
Vietnam War films
Films produced by Don Carmody
Films produced by John Dunning
1980s English-language films
1980s Canadian films